The 2001–02 Louisville Cardinals men's basketball team represented the University of Louisville in the 2001–02 NCAA Division I men's basketball season, the 88th season of interleague play for the Cardinals. The head coach was Rick Pitino and the team finished the season with an overall record of 19–13. Their longest winning streak was an 8-game streak and the Cardinals never lost more than 3 games in a row.

This was Pitino's first season as Louisville's head coach. Pitino replaced Denny Crum at the end of the 2000–01 season and he made his coaching debut for the Cardinals on October 31, 2001, in an exhibition match against EA Sports with an 81–63 victory.

Preseason

September 11 attacks
During the September 11 attacks, Pitino lost Bill Minardi, his brother-in-law, who was working on the 105th floor of the North Tower for Cantor Fitzgerald on the morning of the attacks.

EA Sports Exhibition
On October 31, 2001, Louisville played the EA Sports All-Stars in an exhibition game at Freedom Hall. The Cardinals won 81-63 and this was the debut for new head coach Rick Pitino.

Regular season
The Cardinals finished the regular season with a record of 17–11, including an 8-8 conference record an appearances in two tournaments. Their longest winning streak included an eight-game winning streak and their longest losing streak was a three-game losing streak.

Postseason and Tournaments
During the postseason, the Cardinals played in the Conference USA tournament and the National Invitation Tournament.

In the CUSA tournament, the Cardinals defeated Texas Christian 110–86 on March 5, 2002, but were defeated by Marquette the next day with a score of 84–76.

On March 12, the team starts the NIT Tournament by defeating Princeton 66–65, but were defeated by Temple 65-62 a week later, finishing the Cardinal's season with an overall record of 19–13. Their game against Princeton was won by a banked jumper by Reece Gaines with 5.3 seconds left in the game.

References

Louisville Cardinals men's basketball seasons
Louisville
Louisville Cardinals men's basketball, 2001-02
Louisville Cardinals men's basketball, 2001-02